The Odyssey Channel was a documentary channel that was previously available on Optus Vision in Australia. It was one of the few channels on pay TV in Australia that had a large amount of Australian content available.

Due to the CSA (Content Sharing Agreement) between Optus and Foxtel, it was closed in 2004. Foxtel would not allow it on their platform due to it competing with their license of the Discovery Channel brand, and Optus decided it could no longer fund it.

Programming
The programming covered eight genres:

Issues
History
People and Places
Science and Technology
Popular Culture
Nature
Arts and Entertainment
Lifestyle
NOVA
  
Some content shown on the channel was sourced from the American and Canadian television network Home & Garden Television (HGTV).

External links
Official Odyssey website (2004 – prior to the channel's closure)

References

Defunct television channels in Australia
Television channels and stations established in 1997
Television channels and stations disestablished in 2004
English-language television stations in Australia